The Cuyahoga Falls City School District is a public school district located in Cuyahoga Falls, Ohio, United States. The district educates about 5,300 students in kindergarten to grade 12.

History

During the COVID-19 pandemic in Ohio the district reduced enforcement of its dress code. Full enforcement returned when the effects of the pandemic declined, although some community members erroneously believed new dress code measures had been introduced.

Andrea Celico became the superintendent in 2022.

Schools

High school
Cuyahoga Falls High School

Middle schools
Bolich Middle School
Roberts Middle School

Elementary schools
DeWitt Elementary
Elizabeth Price Elementary
Lincoln Elementary
Preston Elementary
Richardson Elementary
Silver Lake Elementary

Other
Schnee Learning Center

References

External links

School districts in Summit County, Ohio
Cuyahoga Falls, Ohio